The Paris Institute for Advanced Study (Paris IAS, or Institut d'études avancées de Paris) is an international research center that offers fellowships to researchers from all over the world in the field of humanities and social sciences. It is also open to other disciplines, in particular the life sciences, for projects in dialogue with the humanities and social sciences. The institute was designed to foster high level research, international and interdisciplinary exchanges and the development of new methods and research objects. The Paris IAS hosts yearly an average of twenty five researchers for stays of five to ten months.

History 
The Paris IAS was founded in 2008 by the Foundation Maison des Sciences de l'Homme de Paris, in collaboration with the École des Hautes Études en Sciences sociales (EHESS) and the École normale supérieure (ENS Paris).  It was inspired by the Princeton Institute for Advanced Study, founded in 1930, which counted as its fellows well known researchers such as Albert Einstein, Kurt Gödel or Clifford Geertz, and who served as a model for similar IAS that were subsequently created all over the world.  The Paris IAS became an autonomous institution in 2011, supported by the City of Paris and the Île-de-France Regional authority, the French Ministry for Higher education and Research, as well as Universities and research institutions of the Paris area.

Since 2013, the Institute has been located at the hôtel de Lauzun, a 17th-century "hôtel particulier", lent by its owner the City of Paris. There, the fellows have offices and rooms for their scientific activities (lectures, conferences, etc.). The Paris IAS is a member of the French network of Institutes for Advanced Study and the European network of Institutes for Advanced Studies (NetIAS).  Its current director is Saadi Lahlou, Chair of Social Psychology at the London School of Economics and Political Science. The sociologist Dominique Schnapper is president of the Board of trustees, and the historian Carla Hesse is president of the Scientific advisory board.

Research 
The research fellows work on projects in the humanities and social sciences (disciplines such as history, philosophy, sociology, literature, history of science and others). Gretty Mirdal, who was the director from 2012 until 2018, broadened this field of enquiry by creating a thematic program dedicated to neuro- and cognitive sciences. Research projects at the institute are characterized by an interdisciplinary approach and the development of new methodologies or lines of research.

The fellows as well as the partner institutions of the Paris IAS organize each year about a hundred scientific events in its premises, sometimes addressing major societal issues.

Fellows 
The applications for a fellowship are subject to a selection process meeting the standards of the European Research Council (ERC). Each year, about 25 researchers are selected. Jennifer Boittin, Robert Darnton, Itzhak Fried, Giandomenico Iannetti, Mark Lilla Leonardo López Luján and Elisabeth Spelke can be mentioned among the researchers who were granted a fellowship at the Paris IAS.

Partnerships 

 Sorbonne University
 University of Paris III: Sorbonne Nouvelle
 Paris Descartes University
 Paris Diderot University
 Paris Nanterre University
 University of Paris-Saclay
 School for Advanced Studies in the Social Sciences (EHESS)
 Ecole pratique des hautes études (EPHE)
 Ecole normale supérieure (Paris)

External links 
 Official website of the Paris IAS l’Institut d’études avancées de Paris
 Website of the Réseau français des instituts d’études avancées
 The Paris IAS on EURIAS

References 

Grands établissements
Education in Paris
Social science institutes
Research institutes in France